Marian Odon Orzechowski (24 October 1931 – 29 June 2020) was a Polish politician and a former member of the Polish Communist Party. He served as foreign minister of the People's Republic of Poland from 1985 to 1988.

Early life and education
Orzechowski was born in Radom on 24 October 1931. He received a degree in history from the University of Leningrad in Soviet Union. In 1960, he received PhD from the University of Wrocław.

Career
Orzechowski was a senior politician of the Polish United Workers' Party. He became a member of the central committee of the party in 1966. He served in a variety of party posts and was appointed a central committee secretary. He also headed the party's academy of social sciences. In addition, he became a lecturer of history and political science at the University of Wrocław in 1966. From 1971 to 1975 he served as the rector of the university. He was the chief ideologist of the party, being ideology secretary to which he was elected at the fifth plenum on 27–28 October 1981. From 1984 to 1986 he was the rector of the Academy of Social Sciences.

He was appointed foreign minister on 12 November 1985 to the cabinet led by the then prime minister Zbigniew Messner. He succeeded Stefan Olszowski in the post. In addition, Orzechowski headed the PRON's national council, that was formed by the Polish authorities to develop a close interaction with the church, during that time. He became a member of the politburo in June 1988 while retaining his post as foreign minister. His term as foreign minister ended on 17 June 1988 and he was replaced by Tadeusz Olechowski in the post. From 1988 to 1989 he served as the head of the Communist parliament delegation. In July 1989 Orzechowski lost his position as executive ideology secretary of the party's central committee when Wojciech Jaruzelski resigned from the leadership of the party. However, his membership at the central committee of the party continued for a while.

Views and activities
During his term as foreign minister, Orzechowski stated "historians who were members of the party were particularly inspected by the censors since they were to represent it." In 1986 he was able to persuade the Soviet authorities to appoint Wlodzimierz Natorf, a controversial figure, as the Polish ambassador to Moscow. Orzechowski participated in round table talks between the ruling party and opposition figures that lasted from 6 February to 4 April 1989.

Work
Orzechowski is the author of a book about political conditions in Poland and Polish foreign relations from 1989 to 1994.

References

1931 births
2020 deaths
Rectors of universities in Poland
Members of the Politburo of the Polish United Workers' Party
Ministers of Foreign Affairs of Poland
Members of the Contract Sejm
People from Radom
Polish Round Table Talks participants
20th-century Polish historians
Polish male non-fiction writers
Saint Petersburg State University alumni
University of Wrocław alumni
Academic staff of the University of Wrocław